Christmas Rap may refer to:

"Christmas Rappin'", 1979 song by rapper Kurtis Blow
"Christmas Wrapping", 1981 song by new wave band the Waitresses